Exchange Street may refer to:

Exchange Street Historic District (Attica, New York), a national historic district in Attica, Wyoming County, New York
Exchange Street Historic District (Pawtucket, Rhode Island), a national historic district in Pawtucket, Rhode Island
Exchange Street (Maine), a commercial street in Portland, Maine
Buffalo–Exchange Street station, a passenger rail station in Buffalo, New York